Thomas James C. Baxter (born 1893) was an English professional footballer of the 1920s. Born in Wandsworth, he joined Gillingham from Chelsea in 1920 and went on to make 19 appearances for the club in The Football League.

References

1893 births
English footballers
Footballers from Wandsworth
Gillingham F.C. players
Chelsea F.C. players
Year of death missing
Association football wing halves